Antonio Avendaño y Paz, O.F.M. or Bishop Antonio de San Miguel Avendaño y Paz (1520 – 7 November 1590) was a Roman Catholic prelate who served as Bishop of Quito (1588–1590) and Bishop of La Imperial (1564–1588).

Biography
Antonio Avendaño y Paz was born in Salamanca, Spain in 1520 and ordained a priest in the Order of Friars Minor in 1550.
On 22 March 1564, he was appointed during the papacy of Pope Pius IV as the first Bishop of La Imperial.
On 9 February 1567, he was consecrated bishop by Jerónimo de Loaysa, Archbishop of Lima, with Pedro de la Peña, Bishop of Quito, as co-consecrator, and Father Bartolomé Martinez Menacho y Mesa, assisting. On 17 September 1568, he was installed as Bishop of Concepción.
On 9 March 1588, he was appointed during the papacy of Pope Sixtus V as Bishop of Quito.
He served as Bishop of Quito until his death on 7 November 1590.

While bishop, he was the principal consecrator of Diego de Medellín, Bishop of Santiago de Chile (1577); and the principal co-consecrator of Alfonso Guerra, Bishop of Paraguay (1582).

References

External links and additional sources
 (for Chronology of Bishops) 
 (for Chronology of Bishops) 
 (for Chronology of Bishops) 
 (for Chronology of Bishops) 
 (for Chronology of Bishops) 

16th-century Roman Catholic bishops in Ecuador
Bishops appointed by Pope Pius IV
Bishops appointed by Pope Sixtus V
1520 births
1590 deaths
People from Salamanca
Franciscan bishops
16th-century Roman Catholic bishops in Chile
Roman Catholic bishops of Quito
Roman Catholic bishops of Concepción